is the heart of Hiroshima, Hiroshima Prefecture, Japan.  Naka-ku is home to Hiroshima's central business district and Peace Memorial Park. Major attractions include the Hondori shopping arcade, a covered mall-like street of shops extending east from the Hiroshima Peace Memorial Park to Hatchobori. Also in Naka-ku is Okonomi-mura - a building housing a number of restaurants that serve Hiroshima's famous food, okonomiyaki.

Geography
This place is in the middle of River delta of Ōta River. It's almost flat except around Mt. Eba or Mt.Eba-sarayama.

Nature
Ōta River

Neighbors
North:East Ward
South:Hiroshima Bay
East:South Ward
West:West Ward

Economy
Air China has an office on the 11th floor of the NBF Hiroshima Tatemachi Building in Naka-ku. Asiana Airlines operates a sales office on the ninth floor of the Hiroshima Crystal Plaza Building in Naka-ku.

References

Wards of Hiroshima